Edwin Giovanni Muñoz Rubio (born 6 June 1993) is a Dominican footballer who plays for Rayo Cantabria and the Dominican Republic national team as a right back. He also holds Spanish citizenship.

Club career
Born in Paraíso, Barahona, Muñoz played as a youth for Spanish lower sides Zapillo Atlético and Los Molinos CF. He made his senior debuts for the latter on 6 March 2011 during the 2010–11 campaign, in the regional leagues.

In September 2011, Los Molinos loaned Muñoz to UD Carboneras, in Tercera División. After eight matches played with them, he returned to Los Molinos, that loaned him again, this time to regional side Atlético Bellavista, where he played just once, deciding to come back to Los Molinos and complete the 2011–12 season there.

From the 2012-13 season until his arrival in the Dominican Football League in 2016, Muñoz was a regular player in Spanish Tercera División, playing a total of 115 matches and scoring 3 goals, for CD Comarca de Níjar, CD Huércal, CD Utiel and CD Comarca del Mármol. After his Dominican Republic experience with Atlántico FC, he went back to Spain, signing for CF Torre Levante in late November 2016.

International career
Muñoz made his international debut for Dominican Republic on 26 March 2016, starting in a 1–2 loss against Curaçao for the 2017 Caribbean Cup qualification. He played three days later against Barbados.

References

External links

Edwin Muñoz at LaPreferente.com

1993 births
Living people
People from Barahona Province
Dominican Republic footballers
Association football fullbacks
Tercera División players
Divisiones Regionales de Fútbol players
Dominican Republic emigrants to Spain
Naturalised citizens of Spain
Spanish footballers
Dominican Republic international footballers
CF Torre Levante players
Deportivo Rayo Cantabria players
Liga Dominicana de Fútbol players